Never a Dull Moment is a 1943 American comedy film directed by Edward C. Lilley and written by Mel Ronson and Stanley Roberts. The film stars Ritz Brothers, Frances Langford, Mary Beth Hughes, Franklin Pangborn, Stuart Crawford, George Zucco, Elisabeth Risdon and Jack La Rue. The film was released on November 19, 1943, by Universal Pictures.

Plot
Harry, Jimmy, and Al Ritz portray three vaudevillians ("The Three Funny Bunnies! The only act in show business that lays Easter eggs!"). Mobster Tony Rocco (George Zucco) mistakes them for gangsters and hires them for his nightclub. The Ritzes are unaware that they are expected to steal a valuable necklace from a society matron. When a pickpocket (Mary Beth Hughes) plants the jewelry on Harry, the Funny Bunnies escape, and are hunted both by the police and Rocco's gang.

Cast        
 Al Ritz (one of the Ritz Brothers) as Al
 Jimmy Ritz (one of the Ritz Brothers) as Jimmy
 Harry Ritz (one of the Ritz Brothers) as Harry
 Frances Langford as Julie Russell
 Mary Beth Hughes as Flo Parker
 Franklin Pangborn as Sylvester
 Stuart Crawford as Dick Manning 
 George Zucco as Tony Rocco
 Elisabeth Risdon as Mrs. Schuyler Manning III
 Jack La Rue as Joey
 Sammy Stein as Romeo
 Barbara Brown as Mrs. Lizzie Van Drake
 Douglas Wood as Commodore Barclay
 Charles Jordan as Detective Murphy
 John Sheehan as Bartender
 George Chandler as Lunch Counter Patron
 Eddie Dunn as Capt. Fogarty
 The Rogers Dancers (Dorothy Rogers, George Rogers, Don Kramer) as Comic Adagio Act
 Grace Poggi and Igor Dega as Exhibition Dancers

Reception
Never a Dull Moment received some of the best notices of the Ritz Brothers' careers. Film Daily: "Ritz Brothers prove a riot in their best picture in a long time. It's never any less than extremely funny. In fact, at times it's positively uproarious... Put this down as a fast-moving musical that hits the bull's eye. Considering that the Ritzes are at their best, nothing less could have been expected." Showmen's Trade Review: "Although the plot is as old as the hills, the Ritz Brothers bring it up to date with some very funny comedy material... The weight of the film is carried by the Ritz Brothers' antics with the accent on hokum, but as usual the speed with which they work keeps the show rolling at a lively clip." Variety: "Geared for twin bills, Never a Dull Moment is first-rate light, musical entertainment, strong as supporting picture on most dualers [double-feature programs], with Ritz Brothers and Frances Langford providing the marquee lustre. Ritzes work better and with brighter material than they've had for some time."

The Ritz Brothers had been signed by Universal Pictures in 1940 for a single picture. Two years later they were approached to make three hourlong musical comedies for the studio's B-picture unit. Never a Dull Moment was the last of the three and, despite its excellent reviews, did not result in any further pictures. The Ritzes left Hollywood for good, concentrating on their live nightclub act and personal appearances. They continued as a headline attraction until Al Ritz's death in 1965.

References

External links
 
 
 
 

1943 films
American comedy films
1943 comedy films
Universal Pictures films
American black-and-white films
1940s English-language films
Films directed by Edward C. Lilley
1940s American films